Silbereisen is a German language surname, meaning  "silver iron" in the German language. Notable people with the name include:
 Florian Silbereisen (born 1981), German Schlager singer and show host
 Kristin Silbereisen (born 1985),  German table tennis player
 Rainer K. Silbereisen (born 1944), German psychologist

References 

Occupational surnames

German-language surnames